Dulce Ann Kintanar Hofer (born June 3, 1967) also known as Doktor Ann, Ann Hofer is a Filipina educator and politician from the province of Zamboanga Sibugay. She is currently the Governor of Zamboanga Sibugay.

Education 
She took up Bachelor of Science in Business Administration at the Ateneo de Manila University. She also has a Master’s degree in Business Administration from the University of the Philippines Cebu and she holds a Doctorate degree in Public Administration from the UP National College of Public Administration and Governance (UP NCPAG). She has had further executive education at the John F. Kennedy School of Government at Harvard University, the University of Chicago Booth School of Business, and the Asian Institute of Management.

Political career 
Hofer ran and won as representative of the then-newly created 2nd legislative district of Zamboanga Sibugay in the 2007 local elections. She ran for governor of Zamboanga Sibugay in 2010 to replace her father, incumbent (at the time) governor George Hofer, but was defeated by Rommel Jalosjos. She ran for congresswoman in 2013 against incumbent congressman Romeo Jalosjos Jr., and was successful. She would proceed to win in the 2016 and 2019 local elections.

In the 2022 local elections, she was term limited, opted to run again for governor of Zamboanga Sibugay, and successfully defeated the incumbent 1st District of Zamboanga Sibugay Wilter "Sharky" Palma II.

House of Representatives
In the 17th Congress, Hofer served as the Chairperson of the Philippine House Committee on Higher and Technical Education.

In the 18th Congress, she is the Chairperson of the Philippine House Committee on Foreign Affairs, and sits in as member of the House Committee on Appropriations. On July 10, 2020, Hofer is among the 70 representatives who voted to reject the franchise renewal of ABS-CBN.

Military career
In 2020, alongside Budget Secretary Wendel Avisado, Hofer is appointed lieutenant colonel in the Philippine Air Force reserve by Defense Secretary Delfin Lorenzana.

Electoral history

2022

2019

References 

21st-century Filipino women politicians
21st-century Filipino politicians
Women members of the House of Representatives of the Philippines
Politicians from Zamboanga Sibugay
1967 births
Living people